Jude Bolton (born 15 March 1980) is a former professional Australian rules football player who played for the Sydney Swans in the Australian Football League (AFL) between 1999 and 2013.

Early life
Growing up, he supported the St Kilda Football Club. He was recruited from and played his junior football at St Bernard's Football Club in Essendon.

AFL career
Bolton played his first senior game for Sydney against Carlton in round 12 of the 1999 season and received a Rising Star Award nomination the following year. By 2001, he was a regular member of the team and went on to represent Australia in the International Rules series in 2004.

On Saturday, 9 April 2011, Bolton laid an AFL-record 19 tackles in a match, playing an integral role in victory over the West Coast Eagles. In the Second Semi-final, he set the new record for the most tackles lain in a VFL/AFL career, surpassing former captain Brett Kirk's tally of 1278 career tackles. His final career total was 1490 tackles, which was the record until surpassed by Lenny Hayes late in 2014.

On 26 August 2013, Bolton announced he would retire at the conclusion of the 2013 season.

After football
In December 2013 Bolton was a crew member aboard racing supermaxi yacht Perpetual Loyal in the 2013 Sydney to Hobart Yacht Race, with other celebrity crew members, Karl Stefanovic, Larry Emdur, Tom Slingsby, Phil Waugh and Guillaume Brahimi.

He is currently seen as a boundary rider for the Seven Network's coverage of AFL matches played in Sydney.

He appeared as a contestant on the fifteenth season of Dancing with the Stars paired with professional dancer Dianne Buswell. Jude's wife, Lynette, competed against Jude. On 16 August 2015, Jude and Dianne were eliminated, coming in seventh place, and Jude was eliminated one week after Lynette.

Personal life
His wife Lynette Bolton starred in WAG Nation, a reality show that documented the lives of five wives and girlfriends of Australian sportsmen. Bolton has two daughters. Jude was inducted into the St.Bernards College Hall of Fame in 2017.

Statistics

|- style="background-color: #EAEAEA"
! scope="row" style="text-align:center" | 1999
|style="text-align:center;"|
| 24 || 9 || 3 || 1 || 64 || 43 || 107 || 17 || 13 || 0.3 || 0.1 || 7.1 || 4.8 || 11.9 || 1.9 || 1.4
|- 
! scope="row" style="text-align:center" | 2000
|style="text-align:center;"|
| 24 || 16 || 15 || 3 || 126 || 73 || 199 || 36 || 27 || 0.9 || 0.2 || 7.9 || 4.6 || 12.4 || 2.3 || 1.7
|- style="background-color: #EAEAEA"
! scope="row" style="text-align:center" | 2001
|style="text-align:center;"|
| 24 || 23 || 14 || 7 || 199 || 122 || 321 || 72 || 46 || 0.6 || 0.3 || 8.7 || 5.3 || 14.0 || 3.1 || 2.0
|- 
! scope="row" style="text-align:center" | 2002
|style="text-align:center;"|
| 24 || 19 || 9 || 9 || 139 || 124 || 263 || 58 || 67 || 0.5 || 0.5 || 7.3 || 6.5 || 13.8 || 3.1 || 3.5
|- style="background-color: #EAEAEA"
! scope="row" style="text-align:center" | 2003
|style="text-align:center;"|
| 24 || 24 || 13 || 6 || 266 || 212 || 478 || 104 || 76 || 0.5 || 0.3 || 11.1 || 8.8 || 19.9 || 4.3 || 3.2
|- 
! scope="row" style="text-align:center" | 2004
|style="text-align:center;"|
| 24 || 24 || 12 || 7 || 280 || 211 || 491 || 83 || 102 || 0.5 || 0.3 || 11.7 || 8.8 || 20.5 || 3.5 || 4.3
|- style="background-color: #EAEAEA"
! scope="row" style="text-align:center" | 2005
|style="text-align:center;"|
| 24 || 24 || 3 || 5 || 270 || 182 || 452 || 80 || 122 || 0.1 || 0.2 || 11.3 || 7.6 || 18.8 || 3.3 || 5.1
|- 
! scope="row" style="text-align:center" | 2006
|style="text-align:center;"|
| 24 || 25 || 12 || 7 || 308 || 160 || 468 || 77 || 134 || 0.5 || 0.3 || 12.3 || 6.4 || 18.7 || 3.1 || 5.4
|- style="background:#eaeaea;"
! scope="row" style="text-align:center" | 2007
|style="text-align:center;"|
| 24 || 23 || 6 || 10 || 214 || 198 || 412 || 66 || 105 || 0.3 || 0.4 || 9.3 || 8.6 || 17.9 || 2.9 || 4.6
|- 
! scope="row" style="text-align:center" | 2008
|style="text-align:center;"|
| 24 || 24 || 11 || 5 || 244 || 231 || 475 || 84 || 143 || 0.5 || 0.2 || 10.2 || 9.6 || 19.8 || 3.5 || 6.0
|- style="background:#eaeaea;"
! scope="row" style="text-align:center" | 2009
|style="text-align:center;"|
| 24 || 22 || 12 || 8 || 228 || 243 || 471 || 69 || 155 || 0.5 || 0.4 || 10.4 || 11.0 || 21.4 || 3.1 || 7.0
|- 
! scope="row" style="text-align:center" | 2010
|style="text-align:center;"|
| 24 || 24 || 15 || 7 || 196 || 303 || 499 || 67 || 138 || 0.6 || 0.3 || 8.2 || 12.6 || 20.8 || 2.8 || 5.8
|- style="background:#eaeaea;"
! scope="row" style="text-align:center" | 2011
|style="text-align:center;"|
| 24 || 22 || 19 || 12 || 230 || 199 || 429 || 53 || 154 || 0.9 || 0.5 || 10.5 || 9.0 || 19.5 || 2.4 || 7.0
|- 
! scope="row" style="text-align:center" | 2012
|style="text-align:center;"|
| 24 || 22 || 23 || 10 || 183 || 253 || 436 || 70 || 117 || 1.0 || 0.5 || 8.3 || 11.5 || 19.8 || 3.2 || 5.3
|- style="background:#eaeaea;"
! scope="row" style="text-align:center" | 2013
|style="text-align:center;"|
| 24 || 24 || 29 || 17 || 166 || 164 || 330 || 69 || 91 || 1.2 || 0.7 || 6.9 || 6.8 || 13.8 || 2.9 || 3.8
|- class="sortbottom"
! colspan=3| Career
! 325
! 196
! 114
! 3113
! 2718
! 5831
! 1005
! 1490
! 0.6
! 0.4
! 9.6
! 8.4
! 17.9
! 3.1
! 4.6
|}

References

External links

1980 births
Living people
Sydney Swans players
Sydney Swans Premiership players
People educated at St. Bernard's College, Melbourne
Australian rules footballers from Victoria (Australia)
Calder Cannons players
Aberfeldie Football Club players
Australia international rules football team players
Two-time VFL/AFL Premiership players